Unione Sportiva Dilettante Cirié Calcio (formerly Unione Sportiva Dilettante Orbassano Cirié) is an Italian association football club located in Cirié, Piedmont. It currently plays in Serie D. Its colors are black and blue.

External links
 Official homepage
 Ciriè page @ Serie-D.com

Association football clubs established in 1930
Football clubs in Piedmont and Aosta Valley
1930 establishments in Italy
Cirié